Raúl Ramírez (born 20 June 1953) is a Mexican retired professional tennis player. He was active during the 1970s and 1980s. Ramírez was the first player to finish first in both singles and doubles Grand Prix point standings, accomplishing the feat in 1976. He attended and played tennis at the University of Southern California in Los Angeles.

Personal life
Ramírez was born in Ensenada, Baja California. In 1981, he married the Venezuelan-born former Miss Universe Maritza Sayalero. The couple lives in Ensenada and has three children: Rebecca (born 1982), Raúl (born 1984), and Daniel Francisco (1989).

Career
Ramirez was ranked as high as World No. 4 (achieving this ranking on 7 November 1976) and he is one of the all-time leading doubles winners, having spent 62 weeks ranked World No. 1 in doubles, beginning 12 April 1976. He won 19 singles titles, including titles at the ATP Masters Series events in Rome (1975) and Monte Carlo (1978).

He won 60 doubles titles, including Wimbledon (1976), the French Open (1975 & '77), and at ATP Masters Series events in Cincinnati (1978), Canada (1976, ’77 & ’81), Monte Carlo (1979), Paris (1977), and Rome (1974, ’75, ’76 & ’77). He won the WCT World Doubles twice in 1975 and 1980. He won the men's singles in the Ojai Tennis Tournament in 1971.

He played tournaments of the two world tennis circuits played at the time, the Grand Prix tennis circuit and the World Championship Tennis (WCT). These circuits were predecessors of the Association of Tennis Professionals Tour (ATP Tour). In 1975 he won the Grand Prix, the present day equivalent of the Race.

Grand Slam tournament finals

Doubles finals, 7 (3 titles, 4 runners-up)

Mixed doubles final, 1 (runner-up)

ATP career finals

Singles: 40 (19 titles, 21 runner-ups)

Doubles: 101 (60 titles, 41 runners-up)

Grand slam tournament timelines

Singles

Doubles

References

External links
 
 
 

1953 births
Living people
Mexican male tennis players
Sportspeople from Baja California
People from Ensenada, Baja California
University of Southern California alumni
Grand Slam (tennis) champions in men's doubles
French Open champions
Wimbledon champions
ATP number 1 ranked doubles tennis players